Zodarion vankeerorum is a spider species found in Greece.

See also 
 List of Zodariidae species

References

External links 

vankeerorum
Spiders described in 2009
Spiders of Europe
Fauna of Greece